The Never Ending Tour is the popular name for Bob Dylan's endless touring schedule since June 7, 1988.

Information
The tour started off in Europe in a small venue called Debaser Medis in Stockholm, Sweden and continued on to the Globe Arena and the rest of Europe. Dylan performed six shows in the United Kingdom, one in Scotland and five in England, performing two nights at London's Wembley Arena. This was the eleventh and twelfth time Dylan had performed at the Arena.

After completing his European tour Dylan and his band traveled to North America to perform a twenty-seven date tour comprising twenty-six concerts in the United States and five concerts in Canada. The tour started with two performances at The Borgata in Atlantic City, New Jersey on June 22 and June 23. The tour finished on July 28 in Kelseyville, California.

Dylan traveled to New Zealand and Australia to perform a series of twelve concerts over twenty days. The tour included two performances at the Sydney Entertainment Centre and two performances at the Rod Laver Arena in Melbourne.

Dylan traveled back from Oceania to perform a further thirty-one concerts in the United States. This leg of the tour also contained Dylan's 2000th performance on the Never Ending Tour. This date was October 16 at the Nutter Center in Fairborn, Ohio. The tour came to an end thirteen days later after a three-night residency at the Chicago Theatre.

Tour dates

Festivals and other miscellaneous performances

Box office score data

References

External links

BobLinks – Comprehensive log of concerts and set lists
Bjorner's Still on the Road – Information on recording sessions and performances

Bob Dylan concert tours
2007 concert tours